Michael Lawlor Phelan (born June 8, 1947 in Sherbrooke, Quebec) is a judge of the Federal Court of Canada.

Career
Phelan was educated at Loyola College in Montreal (BA, 1968) and Dalhousie University Law School (LLB, 1971). He was called to the Bar of Ontario in 1973. On November 19, 2003, he was appointed Judge of the Federal Court, and ex officio, member of the Federal Court of Appeal, and then Judge of the Court Martial Appeal Court of Canada, April 27, 2004.

Anglophone Quebec people
Judges of the Federal Court of Canada
Living people
People from Sherbrooke
1947 births
Judges of the Court Martial Appeal Court of Canada